Spilarctia whiteheadi is a moth of the family Erebidae. It was described by Walter Rothschild in 1910. It is found on Luzon in the Philippines.

References

whiteheadi
Moths described in 1910